Charles III (18 February 1543 – 14 May 1608), known as the Great, was Duke of Lorraine from 1545 until his death.

Life
He was the eldest surviving son of Francis I, Duke of Lorraine, and Christina of Denmark.

In 1545, his father died, and his mother served as the regent during his minority.  During his childhood, his aged great-grandmother, Philippa of Gelderland, died in 1547, leaving also her inheritance to the young Charles.  His dynasty claimed the Kingdom of Jerusalem and used also the title of Duke of Calabria as symbol of their claims to the Kingdom of Naples. Additionally, they had a claim to the Duchy of Gelderland, inherited from Charles of Egmont, Duke of Gelderland.

In 1552, Lorraine was invaded by France, his mother's regency was terminated and Charles was removed from Lorraine to France, to be raised at the French royal court in accordance to the needs of French interests.  In 1559, he was married to Claude of France, and allowed to depart to Lorraine and take control of his domain.

The reign of Charles III is regarded as a great age of peace and prosperity for Lorraine. He pursued a policy of neutrality between France and The Holy Roman Empire, as well as during the French Wars of Religion.  He founded the University of Pount-a-Mousson.  He also expanded his realm by the incorporation of Pfalzburg from George John I, Count Palatine of Veldenz, in 1590, and tried to conquer also Lützelstein, though George John I's widow, Anna of Sweden, managed to negotiate a truce.

In 1589, he broke his policy of neutrality and allied himself with the French Catholic League because he, as a Catholic, could not accept Henry of Navarre as king of France. In his peace with Henry in 1594, he married his son to Henry's sister Catherine de Bourbon.

Family
He married Claude of Valois, princess of France, daughter of king Henry II and Catherine de' Medici. They had the following children:

Henry II, Duke of Lorraine (1563–1624) married Catherine de Bourbon and Margerita Gonzaga
Christine (1565–1637), married Ferdinando I de' Medici, Grand Duke of Tuscany
Charles (1567–1607), Cardinal of Lorraine and Bishop of Metz (1578–1607), Bishop of Strasbourg (1604–1607)
Antoinette (1568–1610), married John William, Duke of Jülich-Cleves-Berg.
Anne (1569–1576)
Francis II, Duke of Lorraine (1572–1632) married Christina of Salm
Catherine (1573 † 1648), Abess de Remiremont
Elisabeth Renata (1574–1635), married Maximilian I, Elector of Bavaria
 Claude, 1575–1576.

Ancestors

See also

 Dukes of Lorraine family tree

References

Sources

Dukes of Lorraine
Dukes of Bar
Marquesses of Pont-à-Mousson
1543 births
1608 deaths
Lorraine, Charles 3
Modern child monarchs
Hereditary Princes of Lorraine
Nobility from Nancy, France
Princes of Lorraine